Marc de Bonte (27 February 1990 – 5 November 2016) was a Belgian kickboxer who competed in the light heavyweight and cruiserweight divisions. He won bronze at the IFMA World Championships in 2010 and silver in 2012 as an amateur, and debuted with the Glory promotion in October 2012. De Bonte went missing on the night/early morning 4 and 5 November 2016.

Career
De Bonte began practicing kickboxing and Muay Thai at six years old. As an amateur, he took a bronze medal at the 2010 IFMA World Championships in Bangkok, Thailand. He followed this up with a silver at the 2012 games in Saint Petersburg, Russia where he lost to Artem Levin in the final.

In 2011, he signed with the Muaythai Premier League but was able to fight just once in the short-lived promotion, a split decision win over Jiri Zak at Muaythai Premier League: Strength and Honor in Padova, Italy on 8 October 2011.

He knocked out Michael Buxant via a fifth round knee at MaxPain in Genk, Belgium on 10 February 2012 to win the Belgian −81 kg/181 lb Championship.

The following year, de Bonte was recruited by Glory, the world's premier kickboxing organization, and he made his promotional debut at Glory 2: Brussels on 6 October 2012 in Brussels, Belgium where he lost to Murthel Groenhart by knockout from a knee in round two of their 79 kg/175 lb bout.

He returned at Glory 6: Istanbul in Istanbul, Turkey on 6 April 2013, moving up to the 85 kg/187 lb division to face L'houcine "Aussie" Ouzgni. He won via a knee KO early in round one to move up to the #3 spot in Glory's middleweight rankings.

He was set to fight Nieky Holzken in the Glory 13: Tokyo - Welterweight World Championship Tournament semi-finals in Tokyo, Japan on 21 December 2013. However, he was then replaced by Raymond Daniels in the tournament for undisclosed reasons.

He was set to fight against Nieky Holzken for the inaugural Glory Welterweight (-77.1 kg/170 lb) Championship at Glory 14: Zagreb in Zagreb, Croatia on 8 March 2014 but the fight was cancelled when Holzken suffered a shoulder injury in a car accident. The match was rescheduled for Glory 16: Denver in Broomfield, Colorado, US on 3 May 2014 but Holzken withdrew once again due to his recurring shoulder injury and was replaced by Karapet Karapetyan. De Bonte defeated Karapetyan via a split decision to take the title.

He lost his title against Joseph Valtellini at Glory 17: Los Angeles in Inglewood, California, US on 21 June 2014 when he dropped a unanimous decision. Both fighters scored knockdowns in the fight; Valtellini dropped de Bonte with a high kick in round three, while de Bonte floored Valtellini with a flying knee in round four.

Missing person case and death

On the night of 4 November 2016 De Bonte attended a party organized by the gym he worked at in Bladel, Netherlands. He left the party and texted his girlfriend, telling her he would stop by a friend for a drink in Turnhout, Belgium, before going to her place in Best, the Netherlands. De Bonte never arrived at his girlfriend's place and he was reported missing by his family. His car was found next to the Wilhelmina Canal, a canal which runs through Best, Netherlands. Extensive police searches in the Netherlands and Belgium did not lead to any clues on De Bonte's whereabouts. On 24 November De Bonte's body was discovered floating in the Wilhelmina Canal in Oirschot, not far from the place where his car was discovered. The cause of death has not been determined yet, with the autopsy having taken place on 26 November.

Championships and accomplishments

Kickboxing
Glory
 Glory Welterweight (-77kg/170lb) Championship (one time; first)
Belgian Kickboxing
Belgian −81 kg/181 lb Championship
International Federation of Muaythai Amateur
2010 IFMA World Championships −81 kg/178 lb Bronze Medalist 
2012 IFMA World Championships −81 kg/178 lb Silver Medalist

Boxing record

|-  style="background:#cfc;"
| 2011-11-11 || Win ||align=left|Antonio Manuel || Sporthal Arena, Deurne || Antwerp, Belgium || Decision (unanimous) || 4 || 3:00 || 1-0
|-
| colspan=9 | Legend:

Kickboxing record

|-  style="background:#cfc;"
| 2016-09-10|| Win ||align=left| Artur Gorlov|| Kunlun Fight 51 - 80 kg 2016 Tournament Quarter-Finals || Fuzhou, China || TKO || 3 || 
|-
! style=background:white colspan=9 |
|-
|-  style="background:#fbb;"
| 2014-06-21 || Loss ||align=left| Joseph Valtellini || Glory 17: Los Angeles || Inglewood, California, USA || Decision (unanimous) || 5 || 3:00
|-
! style=background:white colspan=9 |
|- style="background:#cfc;"
| 2014-05-03 || Win ||align=left| Karapet Karapetyan || Glory 16: Denver || Broomfield, Colorado, USA || Decision (split) || 5 || 3:00
|-
! style=background:white colspan=9 |
|- style="background:#cfc;"
| 2013-04-06 || Win ||align=left| L'houcine Ouzgni || Glory 6: Istanbul || Istanbul, Turkey || KO (left knee) || 1 || 1:16
|- style="background:#fbb;"
| 2012-10-06 || Loss ||align=left| Murthel Groenhart || Glory 2: Brussels || Brussels, Belgium || KO (knee) || 2 ||
|- style="background:#cfc;"
| 2012-02-10 || Win ||align=left| Michael Buxant || MaxPain || Genk, Belgium || KO (knee) || 5 ||
|-
! style=background:white colspan=9 |
|- style="background:#cfc;"
| 2011-10-08 || Win ||align=left| Jiri Zak || Muaythai Premier League: Strength and Honor || Padova, Italy || Decision (split) || 3 || 3:00
|- style="background:#cfc;"
| 2011-04-09 || Win ||align=left| Fikri Demirci || A1 World Combat Cup || Eindhoven, Netherlands || Decision || 3 || 3:00
|- style="background:#cfc;"
| 2010-11-21 || Win ||align=left|Joep Beerepoot || || Zaandam, Netherlands || || ||
|- style="background:#cfc;"
| 2010-00-00 || Win ||align=left|Michael Smit || || Belgium || Decision || 3 || 3:00
|- style="background:#cfc;"
| 2008-01-19 || Win ||align=left| Geronimo de Groot || Heat FC || Heesch, Netherlands || Decision || 3 || 2:00
|-

|- style="background:#fbb;"
| 2012-09-11 || Loss ||align=left| Artem Levin || IFMA 2012 World Championships, Final || Saint Petersburg, Russia || Decision || 4 || 2:00
|-
! style=background:white colspan=9 |

|-  bgcolor="#cfc"
| 2012-09-11 || Win ||align=left| Kada Bouamama || 2012 IFMA World Championships, Semi Finals|| Saint Petersburg, Russia ||  ||  ||

|-  bgcolor="#cfc"
| 2012-09-10 || Win ||align=left| Kim Olsen || 2012 IFMA World Championships, Quarter Finals|| Saint Petersburg, Russia ||  ||  ||
|-
| colspan=9 | Legend:

References

External links
 Official site
 Official MPL profile
 

1990 births
2016 deaths
Light-heavyweight boxers
Belgian male kickboxers
Light heavyweight kickboxers
Cruiserweight kickboxers
Belgian Muay Thai practitioners
Sportspeople from Turnhout
Belgian expatriates in the Netherlands
Belgian male boxers
Glory kickboxers
Kunlun Fight kickboxers